Taiwo Olubunmi Abioye is a Nigerian professor of English with specialization in Stylistics and applied linguistics. She is the first woman to be Deputy Vice Chancellor in Covenant University.

Early life and education 
Born January 17, 1958, in Kaduna to parents from Ogun State, Abioye had her first degree in Language Arts from Ahmadu Bello University. Graduating with second class upper division in 1987. She got her master's degree and doctorate degrees from the same institution in 1992 and 2004 respectively. In 1982, Abioye was the best graduating student in English department.

Career 
Abioye started her lecturing career as a graduate assistant at Ahmadu Bello University in 1988, within the next decade she rose through the ranks to become a senior lecturer at ABU. In 2005, she joined Covenant University and was made an associate professor in 2010, then a full professor three years later. In April 2016, she admonished members of the student governing body to align themselves with the dictates of their office. In 2011, she published Language and Ideology in George Ehusani's Writings, the book was warmly received by George Ehusani and independent reviewers. She was previously the DVC (administration) for two years, before becoming Deputy Vice Chancellor in 2014.

Google Scholar index ranked top a 2009 article titled Typology of rhetorical questions as a stylistic device in writing. The study looked at how Nigerians adopted a language different from their mother's tongue, specifically the manner of expression in these languages among non-native users, and the influence of this method on the speaker. Additionally, the study analyzed the subject of rhetorical questions, while discussing the pros and cons among Nigerians. The paper is available in International Journal of Language Society and Culture.

References 

1958 births
Living people
Nigerian women academics
Academic staff of Covenant University
Academic staff of Ahmadu Bello University
Ahmadu Bello University alumni
People from Kaduna State